Co's shrew mouse (Soricomys leonardocoi) is a rodent of the genus Soricomys found on the island of Luzon, in the northern Philippines.

References

Rodents of the Philippines
Mammals described in 2012
Soricomys